Gregory Linn Polis (August 8, 1950 – March 18, 2018) was a Canadian professional ice hockey player. Polis played in the National Hockey League (NHL) for the Pittsburgh Penguins, St. Louis Blues, New York Rangers and Washington Capitals.

Early life
Born in Westlock, Alberta, Polis grew up in Dapp, a nearby prairie town with a population of 75. With few other children in town, he would bring his pet Labrador Retriever to chase down and retrieve the puck. Statements such as "Greg's dog used to chase pucks for him in his childhood" - with associated cartoon - were an annual highlight of his Topps and O-Pee-Chee hockey cards in the early 1970s, the repetition of which became a source of amusement to hockey card collectors over the years.

Career
Polis played for the Estevan Bruins in the Canadian Major Junior Hockey League and Western Canada Hockey League (precursors of the Western Hockey League) for four seasons, and was regarded as one of the best players to come out of that junior level organization. He was named as a league all star at left wing three times, and finished second in scoring in the league twice.

After advancing through the junior levels, Polis was selected by the Pittsburgh Penguins as their first choice in the 1970 NHL Amateur Draft (seventh overall). He played in the All-Star Game during his first three years with the Penguins. He played with three other teams during an injury-plagued career. Polis served his last pro season with the Washington Capitals in 1979–80.

Death
Polis died of cancer in Courtenay, British Columbia on March 18, 2018.

Awards and achievements
WCHL All-Star Team (1969, 1970)
All-Star Game: 1971, 1972, 1973
All-Star Game Most Valuable Player: 1973
Pittsburgh Briere Award (Rookie of Year): 1970–71

Career statistics

References

External links

1950 births
2018 deaths
Estevan Bruins players
Hershey Bears players
Ice hockey people from Alberta
National Hockey League first-round draft picks
New Haven Nighthawks players
New York Rangers players
People from Westlock County
Pittsburgh Penguins draft picks
Pittsburgh Penguins players
St. Louis Blues players
Washington Capitals players
Canadian ice hockey left wingers